Brenta is a station on Line 3 of the Milan Metro in Milan, Italy. The station was opened on 12 May 1991 as part of the extension of the line from Porta Romana to San Donato.

The station is located on Corso Lodi at the intersection with Viale Brenta, which is in the municipality of Milan. This is an underground station with two tracks in two different tunnels.

References

Line 3 (Milan Metro) stations
Railway stations opened in 1991
1991 establishments in Italy
Railway stations in Italy opened in the 20th century